Czechville is an unincorporated community located in the town of Milton, in Buffalo County, Wisconsin, United States.

References

Unincorporated communities in Buffalo County, Wisconsin
Unincorporated communities in Wisconsin
Czech-American culture in Wisconsin
Czech communities in the United States